Philippe Edmond-Mariette (born 15 October 1955 in Fort-de-France, Martinique) is a politician from Martinique.
In the 2002 French legislative election he was the substitute candidate for Pierre-Jean Samot for Martinique's 3rd constituency.  Samot's election  was invalidated by the Constitutional Council on 27 February 2003 and he was replaced by Edmond-Mariette, who held the constituency until 2007.

References 

 page on the French National Assembly website

1955 births
Living people
People from Fort-de-France
Martiniquais politicians
Deputies of the 12th National Assembly of the French Fifth Republic
Black French politicians